John Grieve VC (3 May 1821 – 1 December 1873) was a Scottish recipient of the Victoria Cross, the highest and most prestigious award for gallantry in the face of the enemy that can be awarded to British and Commonwealth forces.

Grieve was 34 years old, and a sergeant-major in the 2nd Dragoons (Royal Scots Greys), British Army at the Battle of Balaclava during the Crimean War when the following deed took place on 25 October 1854 at Balaklava, Crimea, for which he was awarded the VC.
His citation in the London Gazette read:

Grieve later achieved the rank of lieutenant and buried in Inveresk cemetery.

His VC is on display at the Art Gallery of South Australia in Adelaide, Australia. It had been in the possession of his nephews A. I and J. H. Oliver of Cowandilla, South Australia.

He died in East Lothian on 1 December 1873 and was buried in Inveresk parish churchyard. The grave lies in the centre of the section of the original churchyard west of the church.

Possible relation to other VC winner
A number of references including the 1997 edition of The Register of the Victoria Cross list Sergeant Major John Grieve VC (Crimea, 1854) and Captain Robert Cuthbert Grieve (Belgium, 1917) as great uncle and great nephew. This connection was suggested by an article in The Times on 29 May 1964. The article said John Grieve sent home £75 from the Crimea to Robert Grieve and that if Robert Grieve was his brother and also emigrated, then some relationship may be established between the Crimean VC and an Australian First World War VC, Robert Grieve. However, descendants of both Grieve families have been in contact with each other and have found that they are not great uncle and great nephew.

References

Monuments to Courage (David Harvey, 1999)
The Register of the Victoria Cross (This England, 1997)
Scotland's Forgotten Valour (Graham Ross, 1995)

External links
Gravestone
Location of grave and VC medal (Lothian, Scotland)

British recipients of the Victoria Cross
Crimean War recipients of the Victoria Cross
British Army personnel of the Crimean War
Royal Scots Greys soldiers
Royal Scots Greys officers
1821 births
1873 deaths
People from Musselburgh
British Army recipients of the Victoria Cross